Victory Road to the King of Neo Visual Rock is a compilation album by Miyavi released on April 22, 2009. It contains songs from all of Miyavi's singles from late 2004 to the release of the compilation. It charted 65th on Oricon and 91st on Billboard Japan.

Track listing

References

2008 albums
Miyavi albums